Phillip James Tuczynski (born January 11, 1947) is a former member of the Wisconsin State Assembly.

He born in Milwaukee, Wisconsin. He attended the University of Wisconsin–Milwaukee and the University of Wisconsin Law School.

Career
Tuczynski was first elected to the Assembly in 1974. He is a Democrat.

References

Politicians from Milwaukee
University of Wisconsin–Milwaukee alumni
University of Wisconsin–Madison alumni
University of Wisconsin Law School alumni
1947 births
Living people
Democratic Party members of the Wisconsin State Assembly